Highway M15 is a Ukrainian international highway (M-highway) connecting Odesa to Reni. The entire route is part of European route E87. The highway is also known as the highway Odesa–Reni.

Description
The highway crosses the border with Moldova twice and west of the city of Reni it continues as Moldovan national road M3. The highway also passes the Moldovan village Palanca, Ștefan Vodă where Ukraine has jurisdiction on the road.

The highway stretches through the historic and cultural region of Budzhak and ends at the "Reni" border checkpoint.

The section of M15 from Reni to Izmail was previously designated as P33. A portion of the highway Odesa–Reni between Reni and Orlivka follows the narrow strip of land that is between Lake Cahul and the Danube.

Route

See also

 Roads in Ukraine
 Ukraine Highways
 International E-road network
 Pan-European corridors

References

External links
 International Roads in Ukraine in Russian
 European Roads in Russian

Roads in Odesa Oblast
Roads in Ukraine
Roads in Moldova
Transport in Odesa